The GP Impanis-Van Petegem (also known as the Primus Classic) is a single-day road bicycle race held annually since 1982 in the region of Flemish Brabant, Belgium. The race was originally organized as a tribute to Raymond Impanis in and around Kampenhout and known as the GP Impanis. Between 1995 and 2004, the race was no longer organized, only to be reinstated in 2005 as a race only for juniors (under 21). In 2011, the race was again organised for professional cyclists and upgraded to a 1.2 event on the UCI Europe Tour. It was also renamed to GP Impanis-Van Petegem in honor of Peter Van Petegem. Since then, the race has started near Brakel, the birthplace of Van Petegem, and has finished close to Kampenhout, namely in Haacht. The race became a 1.1 event in 2012 and was upgraded to 1.HC in 2015.

In 2020, the race was upgraded to 1.Pro and added to the inaugural UCI ProSeries; however, the cancellation of the 2020 edition meant that the race made its UCI ProSeries debut in 2021.

Winners

References

External links 
 Official Website 

UCI Europe Tour races
Recurring sporting events established in 1982
1982 establishments in Belgium
Cycle races in Belgium